Switzerland has participated in the Eurovision Young Dancers 9 times since its debut in 1985. Switzerland has hosted the contest once, in 1995.

Participation overview

Hostings

See also
Switzerland in the Eurovision Song Contest
Switzerland in the Eurovision Young Musicians
Switzerland in the Junior Eurovision Song Contest

External links 
 Eurovision Young Dancers

Countries in the Eurovision Young Dancers